The Moscow linguistic circle was a group of social scientists in semiotics, literary theory, and linguistics active in Moscow from 1915 to ca. 1924.  Its members included Filipp Fortunatov (its founder), Roman Jakobson, Grigoriy Vinokur, Boris Tomashevsky, and Petr Bogatyrev.  The group was a counterpart to the St. Petersburg linguistic group OPOJAZ; between them, these two groups (together with the later Prague linguistic circle) were responsible for the development of Russian formalist literary semiotics and linguistics.

References

"Moscow Linguistic Circle (literary critic)": entry in the Britannica Online Encyclopedia.

Russian formalism
Linguists from Russia
Literary theory
Schools of linguistics
1910s in Moscow
1920s in Moscow